Shaheed Thakur Ji Pathak (1968 – 1994) was an Indian social activist and politician. He was National General Secretary of Janata Dal. In 1994, Thakur Ji Pathak was murdered by some anti social elements.

Early years
Thakur Ji Pathak  was born in 1968 in the village Narahi in the Ballia district of Uttar Pradesh, India. This village had Good  electricity, Good roads and  transportation, and primary school building. At the age of 3years Thakur Ji Pathak Mother took him To Jamshedpur. He passed from the K.M.P.M Inter College, Jamshedpur Jharkhand.he Intermediate(Arts) at the age of 18.

History

Birth Biography
Thakur Ji Pathak was born to Kedarnath Pathak and Gunjeshwari Devi in 1968, he was the youngest of three children. He was always active and was inclined to the political landscape of India from a very young age.

Political views

Thakurji joined Janata party early in the 1980s to fulfill the demands of poor people from his constituency. Then he join Janata Dal in 1988. He was an active supporter of women's rights and is fondly remembered by his fellow party colleagues.

Thakur Ji Pathak was appointed as National General Secretary of Janata Dal in 1989. Thakur Ji was a famous personality who always helped poor people and farmers. He was very close to the former prime minister of India at that time Chandra Shekhar.

Death
In March 1994, Thakur Ji Pahak was shot by some anti social elements in front of the Jamshedpur High Court.

In popular culture

Shaheed Thakurji Pathak Welfare Society 

After the incident of his murder, his followers named him as "Shaheed Thakur ji Pathak". In the memory of Thakur Ji Pathak the "Thakur Ji Pathak Welfare Society" was founded in 1995. The organization is actively supports needy and poor people.

In memory of Thakur Ji Pathak, the organization fecilitates every year "Shaheed Thakurji Pathak Welfare Award". In 2021 the awardees are Dr. Vishal Rao and Shalini Thakur and Tejasvi Surya.

See also 

 Janata Dal
 Janata Party
List of assassinations in Asia
List of assassinated Indian politicians
List of people from Jamshedpur
List of people from Jharkhand .
List of people from Uttar Pradesh

References

Indian social workers
1968 births
1994 deaths